Noordin Mohammad Top (11 August 1968 – 17 September 2009) was a Malaysian Muslim extremist. He was also referred to as Noordin, Din Moch Top, Muh Top, Top M or Mat Top. Until his death, he was Indonesia's most wanted Islamist militant. 

Born in Kluang, Johor, Malaysia, he is thought to have been a key bomb-maker and/or financier, for Jemaah Islamiyah (JI) along with Jamaah Ansharut Tauhid (JAT), and to have left it, setting up the more violent splinter group Tanzim Qaedat al-Jihad. Noordin was reported by the FBI to be "an explosives expert", and "an officer, recruiter, bomb maker and trainer for the Jemaah Islamiah (JI) group."

Once in Indonesia, he married using the assumed name Abdurrachman Aufi. His wife, Munfiatun, was jailed in June 2005, for concealing information about his whereabouts.

Noordin and Azahari Husin were thought to have masterminded various bombings across Indonesia, mostly in early 2000s.

Noordin may also have assisted in the earlier Philippine consulate bombing in Jakarta, Jakarta Stock Exchange bombing, Christmas Eve 2000 Indonesia bombings and 2002 Bali bombings Noordin (allegedly nicknamed Money man) was an indoctrinator specialising in recruiting militants as suicide bombers, and in collecting funds for militant activities.  Long after first being declared as wanted  by Malaysian and Indonesian authorities, he was added to the FBI's third major wanted list in 2006. FBI Seeking Information - War on Terrorism list. He was killed during a police raid (by Indonesia's anti-terrorist unit Densus 88) in Solo, Central Java, conducted on September 17, 2009.

Bombings
Noordin and Azahari were thought to have masterminded the 2002 Makassar bombing, 2003 Marriott Hotel bombing in Jakarta, 2004 Australian Embassy bombing in Jakarta, 2004 Poso bus bombing, 2005 Bali bombings, 2005 Tentena market bombings, 2005 Palu market bombing, and 2009 JW Marriott - Ritz-Carlton bombing again in Jakarta.

On August 5, 2003 a suicide bomber detonated a car bomb outside the lobby of the JW Marriott Hotel in Jakarta, killing 12 people and injuring 150. Jemaah Islamiyah was suspected of responsibility for the bombing.

In July 2004 a car bomb was exploded outside the Australian embassy in Jakarta, killing several people including the suicide bomber and wounding over 140 others. Jemaah Islamiyah with Azahari Husin and Noordin M. Top were suspected of being behind the bombing.

On October 1, 2005 bombs were detonated in Jimbaran and Kuta in Bali. The bombings killed 23 people, including three bombers trained by Noordin.

In July 2009, two suicide bombers killed seven people at the Ritz Carlton and JW Marriott hotels in Jakarta.  Local anti-terrorism officials said that there were "strong indications" that Noordin Top was behind the attacks.

Fugitive trail
On July 21, 2005, Irun Hidayat was convicted of being an accessory by providing a house to Azahari Husin and Noordin Top. Mbai identified the chief suspect in the 2005 attack as Azahari Husin, who was thought to collaborate with the second suspect Noordin, whose wife was sentenced to three years in prison for harbouring him. Azahari Husin was later killed in a raid in November 2005. On 24 February 2006 the FBI added Noordin among three names to the Seeking Information – War on Terrorism list.

On April 29, 2006 he narrowly escaped capture after his safe-house was raided by heavily armed Indonesian police in Binangun, Central Java. In the altercation, Abdul Hadi and Jabir were killed. In June 2006 it was reported that Noordin was threatening more attacks in video tapes recovered by Indonesian authorities and police believe that he may have formed his own organization outside JI.

On August 8, 2009 there were media reports that he had been killed during a shooting with police near Temanggung, a village in Central Java. Forensic testing conducted by Indonesian police however, disproved this speculation. A body recovered from the ambush site was instead found to be Ibrohim, a key organiser of the 2009 Jakarta bombings.

Death

Indonesian National Police Chief Bambang Hendarso Danuri announced on September 17, 2009 that Noordin was killed in a police raid along with three other terrorists. Police hunting for suspects in bombings of July 2009 tracked the seven suspects to Solo in Central Java and besieged a village house in Mojosongo, Jebres District overnight. The raid ended near daybreak when an explosion was detonated inside the home. Four suspected militants were killed and three were captured. The operation left behind a charred house with no roof and blown-out walls. The bodies were flown to Jakarta for autopsies.

Among the four bodies recovered after the raid a corpse was identified as Noordin's; fingerprints taken from the Indonesian corpse matched samples obtained from Malaysia. A similarity was found in at least 14 minutiae points. On 19 September 2009, Indonesian National Police spokesperson announced that a DNA test was also carried out and it was proved that the body was in fact that of Noordin. According to a police intelligence officer, the renter of the house, "Susilo", Noordin's close associate Bagus Budi Pranoto, alias "Urwah" and Aryo Sudarso, alias Mistam Hisamuddin, were killed in the raid, along with Noordin. Police were led to the house after arresting Indonesian militant Rohmat Puji Prabowo at a marketplace in Solo on 16 September.

Sidney Jones, the South east Asia programme director of the International Crisis Group commented that Noordin's death was "a huge and deadly blow for the extremist organizations in Indonesia and the region", because "there isn't another radical leader in Indonesia who has given that same message so consistently."

Marriages
During his exiles and escapes from police raids, Noordin married several women in Indonesia and had several children from those marriages.

He married Munfiatun AKA Fitri on July 7, 2004. Fitri was sentenced to three years in prison for protecting him. He also married an unidentified woman in Rokan Hilir, Riau, during his exile after the first Bali Bombing. Around 2007, he also married Ariani Rahma during his exile in Cilacap. One other unidentified woman was also believed to be Noordin's wife during his time in police custody. These marriages were believed to be a part of his strategy to socialize with the local people to keep his identity secret. His first wife was an Indonesian-born Malaysian woman, who now lives in Johor, Malaysia, with their son.

References

External links
 Rewards for Justice
 FBI Most Wanted Terrorists currently listed web page

1968 births
2009 deaths
People from Kluang
People from Johor
Malaysian Muslims
Malaysian people of Malay descent
Malaysian Islamists
Malaysian criminals
Jemaah Islamiyah
Deaths by firearm in Indonesia
People shot dead by law enforcement officers in Indonesia
Terrorism in Indonesia
Leaders of Islamic terror groups